Mount Frankland North National Park is a national park in the South West Region of Western Australia. It was designated in 2004, and covers an area of 220.69 km2. It is part of the larger Walpole Wilderness Area that was established in the same year.

It is bounded on the east by Mount Roe National Park, and south and west by Mount Frankland National Park. It adjoins Lake Muir National Park to the north.

It is in the Jarrah Forest bioregion, also known as the Southwest Australia woodlands.

References

National parks of Western Australia
South West (Western Australia)
Southwest Australia
Protected areas established in 2004
2004 establishments in Australia
Warren bioregion